The United States Ambassador to Mauritius is the official representative of the government of the United States to the government of Mauritius. The ambassador is concurrently the ambassador to Seychelles, while resident in Port Louis, Mauritius.

Ambassadors

This is a list of United States ambassadors to Mauritius.
March 1968 – June 1968 William B. Hussey; Interim; Established embassy March 12, 1968  
July 29, 1968 – August 16, 1969 David S. King    
June 29, 1970 – July 23, 1973 William D. Brewer    
May 24, 1974 – May 10, 1976 Philip W. Manhard    
June 23, 1976 – September 17, 1978 Robert V. Keeley    
December 20, 1978 – January 20, 1980 Samuel Rhea Gammon III    
April 17, 1980 – September 2, 1983 Robert C. F. Gordon    
November 7, 1983 – August 16, 1986 George Roberts Andrews    
November 14, 1986 – October 21, 1989 Ronald D. Palmer    
December 6, 1989 – November 19, 1992 Penne Percy Korth    
December 15, 1993 – April 14, 1996 Leslie M. Alexander    
August 13, 1996 – July 27, 1999 Harold W. Geisel (Also accredited to the Seychelles) 
August 24, 1999 – March 4, 2001 Mark Wylea Erwin  (Also accredited to the Seychelles)   
April 26, 2002 – June 22, 2005 John Price  (Also accredited to the Seychelles)   
October 2, 2006 – October 14, 2009 Cesar B. Cabrera (Also accredited to the Seychelles)   
February 18, 2010 – February 26, 2011 Mary Jo Wills (Also accredited to the Seychelles) 
November 5, 2012 – January 20, 2017 Shari Villarosa (Also accredited to the Seychelles)
December 13, 2017 – January 15, 2021 David Dale Reimer (Also accredited to the Seychelles)
February 22, 2023 – present Henry V. Jardine (Also accredited to the Seychelles)

See also
Mauritius – United States relations
Foreign relations of Mauritius
Ambassadors of the United States

References

External links
 
United States Department of State: Background notes on Mauritius

Mauritius

United States